Karamu may refer to:

Karamu, New Zealand, a rural locality in the North Island of New Zealand
 Coprosma robusta, a tree known as karamu
 Coprosma lucida, a shrub sometimes called shining karamu
 Coprosma macrocarpa, a shrub called coastal karamu
Karamu (feast), a feast held on December 31 as part of the Kwanzaa celebrations
Karamu House, a theater in Cleveland, Ohio